For Men Only (Italian:Per uomini soli) is a 1938 Italian "white-telephones" comedy film directed by Guido Brignone and starring Antonio Gandusio, Carlo Buti and Paola Barbara.

The film's sets were designed by Piero Filippone. It was made at Cinecittà in Rome.

Cast
 Antonio Gandusio as Barnaba Tamburini  
 Carlo Buti as Carlo Lupoli 
 Paola Barbara as Cecchina Spolveri  
 Fanny Marchiò as Herta Gerbins, l'attrice  
 Guido Riccioli as Ulisse Lupoli  
 Loris Gizzi as Ladislao Paszkowsky, il regista  
 Pina Renzi as Miss Betty Thompson  
 Virgilio Riento as Pasquale Pappalardo 
 Giulio Alfieri as Natalino Sperenza 
 Nino Altieri 
 Oreste Bilancia 
 Enzo Biliotti 
 Pasquale Braucci 
 Remo Brignardelli 
 Giorgio Capecchi 
 Giovanni Conforti 
 Luigi Erminio D'Olivo 
 Bianca Della Corte 
 Alba Ferrarotti 
Giuseppe Gambardella 
 Renato Malavasi 
 Nicola Maldacea 
 Thea Martinero 
 Bebi Nucci 
 Massimo Pianforini
 Vittorio Ripamonti 
 Angelini Vittorio

References

Bibliography 
 Stefano Masi & Enrico Lancia. Les séductrices du cinéma italien. Gremese Editore, 1997.

External links 
 

1938 films
1930s Italian-language films
Italian comedy films
1938 comedy films
Films directed by Guido Brignone
Films shot at Cinecittà Studios
Italian black-and-white films
1930s Italian films